The Pontificia Universidad Católica del Ecuador (PUCE) (English: Pontifical Catholic University of Ecuador) is a Pontifical Catholic university founded in 1946 in Quito, Ecuador.

History
The university opened in the fall of 1946, with Carlos María de la Torre, archbishop of Quito, officiating. Aurelio Espinosa Pólit of the Society of Jesus (Jesuits) was the first rector. That fall there were 54 students and jurisprudence was the single faculty.

Pope Francis visited the campus of PUCE on his trip to South America in July 2015.

Location
The principal campus of the university is in Quito. Other campuses are in Ambato (established in 1982), Esmeraldas (1981), Ibarra (1976), Santo Domingo de los Colorados (1996), and a regional campus in the province of Manabí (1993). The campus in Cuenca later became the Universidad del Azuay. All branches follow the National System PUCE.

Departments

Faculty of Communication, Linguistics, and Literature
Faculty of Management, Accounting, Administration
Faculty of Philosophy, Theology
Faculty of Humanities
Faculty of Natural Sciences
Faculty of Education Sciences
College of Engineering
School of Law
School of Medicine
School of Nursing
School of Psychology
School of Bioanalysis 
School of Economics
School of Architecture, Design, Art
School of Social Work

Faculty of Communication, Linguistics, and Literature (FCLL)
There are four careers that make up the FCLL: Communication, Literature, Linguistics, and Applied Languages. In addition, the Languages Center welcomes regular students of the university and is open to the community.

Espinosa Pólit award for Literature at PUCE
Aurelio Espinosa Pólit, the most prestigious awards for writers and authors is the Espinosa Pólit award for Literarute at PUCE which is one of the biggest awards in Ecuador and is given once a year by a voting panel from Catholica University, and is overseen by  Vicente Robalino, catedrático de la PUCE, Pontificia Universidad Católica del Ecuador.  Taking place every year in Quito at PUCE.

Aurelio Espinosa Pólit was born in Quito on the 11th of July 1894 and is best remembered as one of the best Ecuadorian writer's, poet's, literary critic's and a university professor at PUCE. He co-founded the Pontifical Catholic University of Ecuador, and he founded the Aurelio Espinosa Polit Museum and Library in Quito.

Cultural Center
The P.U.C.E. Cultural Center on the campus in Quito and holds numerous exhibits year round with artists from all over the world.

Notable people

Alumni

 Vicente Cabrera Funes
 Eugenia del Pino
 Jorge Salvador Lara
 Pedro Velasco
 Fabian Alarcon
 Oswaldo Hurtado Larrea
 Jamil Mahuad Witt
 Julio Cesar Trujillo Vasquez
 Enrique Ayala Mora
 Hernan Rodriguez Castelo
 Ivan Carvajal
 Alvaro Aleman
 Mauricio Rodas

Pope Francis visit in July, 2015
Pope Francis was in Quito   for a few days in July 2015.  During his visit in Quito, Pope Francis was the campus of P.U.C.E  on the afternoon of the 7th of July 2015 and spoke to the university.
 and was able to speak to many thousands on different areas.
  The visit also went with a tour of the Historic Centre of Quito.

Gallery

Quito campus

Library

See also
 List of Jesuit sites

References

External links

 Official University website

 
Educational institutions established in 1946
Catholic universities and colleges in Ecuador
1946 establishments in Ecuador